David Lee Emerson,  (born September 17, 1945) is a Canadian politician, financial executive, and economist. He was formerly the Member of Parliament for the riding of Vancouver Kingsway. He was first elected as a Liberal and served as Minister of Industry under Prime Minister Paul Martin. After controversially crossing the floor to join Stephen Harper's Conservatives, he served as Minister of International Trade and Minister for the Pacific Gateway and the Vancouver-Whistler Olympics, followed by Minister of Foreign Affairs.

Early life and business career 
Emerson was born in Montreal, Quebec. He attended the University of Alberta and obtained his Bachelor of Economics degree in 1968 and his Master of Economics degree in 1970. He then went on to Queen's University where he received his Ph.D in economics.

In 1975, after working as a researcher for the Economic Council of Canada, Emerson moved to British Columbia and joined the public service. In 1984, he became deputy minister of finance.

In 1986, Emerson was appointed president and chief executive officer of the Western & Pacific Bank of Canada. He transformed it into the Western Bank of Canada — the only regional bank to survive and prosper. Four years later, he returned as deputy minister of finance and was quickly promoted to deputy minister to the premier and president of the British Columbia Trade Development Corporation.

From 1992 to 1997, Emerson was president and chief executive officer of the newly created Vancouver International Airport Authority.

In 1998, Emerson was appointed president and chief executive officer of Canfor Corporation, a leading integrated forest products company and Canada's largest producer of softwood lumber. With 8,100 workers and annual revenues of $3.2 billion servicing 10% of the U.S. market, Canfor operates pulp and paper mills as well as 19 sawmills across British Columbia, two in Alberta and one in Quebec. Despite US duties and a higher Canadian dollar, Emerson managed to increase profits and raise share prices through a major acquisition deal and efficiency upgrades, which increased capacity by 30% while reducing production costs by 24%.

In 2008, Emerson joined private equity firm CAI Capital Management as a senior advisor.

Emerson's directorships included: Terasen Inc; Royal & Sun Alliance Insurance Company of Canada; vice-chairman of the Canadian Council of Chief Executives; Chair, British Columbia Ferry Services Inc.; and chairman and director of Genus Resource Management Technologies Inc.

Election history 
Bypassing the nomination process, Paul Martin appointed David Emerson as the Liberal candidate in Vancouver Kingsway for the 2004 election. In the general election, he narrowly defeated Ian Waddell of the New Democratic Party (NDP) by 1,351 votes. Waddell had previously represented Vancouver Kingsway from 1979 until 1988, when the riding was abolished and Waddell transferred to Port Moody—Coquitlam.

The 2006 election saw a rematch between Emerson and Waddell. This time, Emerson won handily, defeating Waddell by nearly 10 points as the Liberals nearly swept Vancouver.

Emerson attracted some media attention in December 2005 with a comment that NDP leader Jack Layton had a "boiled dog's head smile". While the term is translated from the common and mild Cantonese insult "烚熟狗頭", Emerson said that he believed it to be a humorous phrase indicating a person with an "overextended grin". Emerson said that his wife, a Cantonese speaker, used the phrase to describe him when he posed for pictures.

Crossing the floor
At some point between election day and the day Stephen Harper was due to be sworn in as prime minister, Emerson accepted an offer from Harper to cross the floor and become Minister of International Trade in Harper's new Conservative minority government. According to Emerson, British Columbia Conservative campaign coordinator John Reynolds called him the day after the election to ask if he was interested in having a conversation with Harper.

Gaining regional representation in Cabinet from key metropolitan areas, such as Vancouver, according to Harper, was key to the decision in asking Emerson to cross the floor. Indeed, 2006 marked the first time in decades that a centre-right party had been completely shut out in Vancouver. However, Emerson's Conservative opponent, Kanman Wong, claimed on February 10, 2006, that Emerson was seriously considering crossing the floor during the run-up to the election. Wong added that he would have stood down in Emerson's favour had he done so.

In any case, Emerson's decision was kept secret from his Liberal colleagues, the press, and even most Conservatives until February 6, 2006, when he arrived at Rideau Hall, the official residence of the Governor General, for the swearing-in of the new government. In addition to his International Trade portfolio, Emerson was given responsibility for the Pacific Gateway and the 2010 Vancouver Winter Olympics, areas of particular importance to the riding of Vancouver-Kingsway and in general, the Greater Vancouver area.  He was ranked third in Cabinet in the order of precedence, behind Harper and House Leader Rob Nicholson, by virtue of his appointment to the Privy Council in 2004.

Emerson had given no public indication that he was thinking of leaving the Liberal Party during the election campaign, Wong's remarks notwithstanding. As a Cabinet minister he had been featured prominently in Liberal TV ads in British Columbia promoting that party as the best choice for voters. He launched several blistering attacks against Harper and the Conservatives during the campaign, including one assertion that under a Harper government, "the strong [would] survive and the weak die". On election night, he told supporters that he wanted to be "Stephen Harper's worst nightmare." In an interview with CTV after being sworn in, he clarified to reporters about the heated partisan rhetoric used during the campaign.  Emerson told CTV that he runs his riding office on a nonpartisan basis, and that his first priority was the interests of the people of Vancouver Kingsway.

Controversy

Part of the Emerson controversy stems from Vancouver Kingsway's voting history.  The riding has long been one of the more left-leaning ones in Vancouver; most election battles take place between the Liberals and NDP.  Vancouver Kingsway previously existed from 1953 to 1988 and elected a Progressive Conservative candidate only once, during the 1958 Tory landslide.  It has not elected a Conservative or any member of its predecessor parties—the PCs, the Reform Party of Canada or the Canadian Alliance—since its recreation in 1997.  The Conservative candidate in 2006, Wong, finished a distant third with only 8,700 votes—12,000 votes behind Emerson and 7,000 behind Waddell—and 19% of the total vote.  In the 2004 election, the Conservative candidate, Jesse Johl, finished with 16.5% of the vote. Both totals were far less than the combined PC/Canadian Alliance vote of 34.4% in 2000. The NDP's vote share of less than 16% in that 2000 election jumped to more than 37% when Emerson first ran in 2004.

Liberal MP and former Minister of Health, Ujjal Dosanjh noted that a poll held prior to the election showed less than 20 per cent of residents in the riding knew Emerson by name, lending credence to the assertions that the Liberal banner played a large part in his election and re-election.

Liberal National President Mike Eizenga said that Emerson knew "if he was running in that riding as a Conservative, he wouldn't have a chance" and has demanded his resignation.  Democracy Watch, a nonpartisan ethics watchdog, said it planned to complain to the Ethics Commissioner since Emerson was still technically a Liberal minister when he accepted Harper's offer.  The group claimed that Emerson's switch violated the federal ethics code and post-employment regulations for officeholders.  NDP MP Peter Julian has also called for an inquiry, claiming that the additional benefits Emerson received as a member compared to those he would have received as an opposition MP carry at least the appearance that Emerson acted in his own private interest.

Bill Graham, acting parliamentary leader of the Liberal Party and Leader of the Opposition, called Emerson's behaviour cynical and claimed his actions diminished "the faith of citizens in a system under which we have to govern."  Martin, who left on a vacation to Europe shortly after resigning as prime minister, was "astonished" by Emerson's defection and criticized both Emerson and Harper for avoiding "an appropriate level of scrutiny on this matter -- a decision that I believe robs Canadians and the people of Vancouver Kingsway of a deserved explanation".

Criticism also came from Emerson's fellow Conservatives. Garth Turner, a Conservative MP from Ontario said that "anyone who crosses the floor ultimately should go back to the people for ratification and I stick by it and hopefully in this case that will happen..." Turner later stated his belief that his criticism "seriously limited" his future in the party. Subsequently, he was eventually kicked out of the Conservative caucus and crossed the floor to sit as a Liberal for which he was also criticized. Myron Thompson of Alberta has also called for Emerson to step down and run in a by-election.

However, MacKay told CTV's Mike Duffy Live that Emerson wanted to continue and finish  the work he already started as Minister of Industry under Martin on a multibillion-dollar softwood lumber deal with the United States—a deal that could potentially bring a huge windfall to Canada and particularly Emerson's major lumber producing province, British Columbia.

MacKay later also said that there was no comparison between Emerson's switch and that of Belinda Stronach. Reynolds also defended Emerson's switch, saying that Vancouver Kingsway got the better end of the bargain since "instead of having someone in opposition, they have someone who is a cabinet minister of a new government." As Minister of International Trade, Emerson will have key influence on matters relevant to constituents of Vancouver-Kingsway particularly as The Greater Vancouver Area prepares for the 2010 Olympics.  The defection also has the support of Vancouver Mayor Sam Sullivan, British Columbia Premier Gordon Campbell, the Vancouver Board of Trade, former Prime Minister Kim Campbell, as well as several prominent businessmen in Vancouver.

In a letter dated Monday February 6, the Vancouver Kingsway Liberal riding association requested that Emerson repay $97,000 spent during his re-election campaign. Emerson has stated that he does not intend to repay any expenses, arguing that he has raised large sums for the Liberal party from his corporate connections. On February 8, 2006, Emerson described Liberal attacks on his defection as a sign of "deep sickness" and said that his children were being treated with hostility at school because of his defection.  Harper called the attacks on Emerson "superficial", the switch was made "in the best interests of not just British Columbia but good government".  Emerson has given some thought to resigning over the furore, but told CBC News in Vancouver on February 10 that he would not resign or run in a byelection.  Aside from that appearance, Emerson cancelled a telephone press conference on February 9 due to traffic.

The furore has reinvigorated support for legislation requiring MPs who switch parties to step down and run for their own vacancy in a by-election.  NDP MP Peter Stoffer announced on February 13 that he would reintroduce a private member's bill making such a provision.  Turner plans to introduce a similar bill, despite pressure from his party to back off.  Speaking on Vancouver radio station CKNW, Emerson said he would be glad to discuss the bill in Parliament:  "I'll participate in that debate, I may even vote for it, and I will certainly abide by it."   Stoffer's earlier floor-crossing bill (C-251) was defeated during the last Canadian Parliament.  Emerson has vowed to resign only if such a law were passed retroactively or if the ethics commissioner found him to be at fault.

A crowd of over 700 gathered at an NDP-organized protest rally in Emerson's riding on Saturday February 11. Another smaller rally took place at Emerson's riding office the next day. On April 2, a crowd, variously estimated between 1000 and 1200 participated in a Walk for Democracy organized by a group calling themselves Real Democracy. At times the tightly packed crowd stretched out over five blocks along one lane of Kingsway as the march proceeded along the 2 kilometre route past Emerson's constituency office to the rally. The next day, another group flew an airplane over Canada's parliament asking the Member of Parliament to "call home". This was in reference to the fact that David Emerson had remained low key and made few public appearances in the riding for the months of February and March.

According to an online poll from The Globe and Mail, 77% of respondents wanted Emerson to step down and run in a by-election.  A similar online poll conducted by Maclean's magazine showed 66% wanted Emerson to run in a by-election. Ipsos Reid in mid-February 2006 conducted a poll of British Columbians and found that even in staunchly Conservative areas of the province, respondents were 75% in favour of a by-election being called.

On March 3, 2006, Ethics Commissioner Bernard Shapiro announced that he was launching a preliminary inquiry into conflict-of-interest allegations against Emerson and Harper. Shapiro says he will look into what influence may have been wielded in the decision by Emerson to cross the floor. On March 20, 2006, Shapiro stated that he was "satisfied that no special inducement was offered by Mr. Harper to convince Mr. Emerson to join his cabinet and his party". He found no wrongdoing on Emerson's part and recommended a parliamentary debate on floor crossing.

Resolution of softwood lumber issue
On April 27, 2006, Prime Minister Harper announced that Canada had reached an agreement with the United States on softwood lumber.  Working closely with Minister Emerson and Canadian ambassador to the U.S. Michael Wilson, this landmark agreement resolved a dispute disrupting Canada–U.S. relations since 1982 when U.S. lumber producers first petitioned against Canadian softwood lumber imports under U.S. countervailing duty law. Previous Liberal governments had enacted two five-year deals, the last one expiring March 31, 2001.  Since then, Canada had been locked in costly domestic and international litigation as U.S. lumber companies charged Canada with dumping subsidized lumber into the U.S. market.

The softwood lumber deal ensured no quotas or tariffs at current lumber prices, repayment of at least $4 billion in unfairly collected duties to lumber companies, and provincial and regional flexibility depending on operating conditions.  "Canada’s bargaining position was strong; our conditions were clear; and this agreement delivers", said the prime minister.  "It’s a good deal that resolves this long-standing dispute and allows us to move on."  The deal also received support from Canada's three major softwood producing provinces, British Columbia, Quebec and Ontario.

Following the initial announcement, the province of British Columbia expressed dissatisfaction with the agreement's details.  Claiming industry support, B.C.'s forestry minister, Rich Coleman, threatened to "derail the deal" if the provincial government's concerns were not met. Under contention were several details, including an "opt-out" clause (allowing either Canadian or U.S. governments to back out of the deal after 23 months).

A number of analysts described the deal as a shameful capitulation of Canadian interests.  The deal included language requiring all Canadian companies to drop legal actions against the U.S. government.

On September 12, 2006, Emerson and U.S Trade Representative Susan Schwab officially signed the deal in Ottawa.

The softwood lumber deal was passed on December 6, 2006, and received Royal Assent on December 12, 2006.

Foreign Affairs ministry
On May 26, 2008, Emerson was appointed Minister of Foreign Affairs following the resignation of Maxime Bernier, though it was reported at the time that Emerson's appointment to the position would be brief. In a cabinet shuffle on June 25, 2008, Prime Minister Harper finalized Emerson's position as Minister of Foreign Affairs.

Retirement
On September 2, 2008, it was reported that Emerson would not run in the 2008 federal election, citing the lengthy commute from Vancouver to Ottawa as the reason. Also, he wanted time to spend with his son, James, his daughter, Elizabeth, and his son-in law, Patrick.
 
In 2009, he was named co-chair (with Paul Tellier) of the Prime Minister's Advisory Committee on the Public Service. He also became a member of the International Advisory Council of the Chinese sovereign wealth fund China Investment Corporation.

References

External links
DavidEmersonLegal.com - Legal issues arising from David Emerson's 2006 change of political party
Profile
Softwood Lumber Deal
 

1945 births
Anglophone Quebec people
Businesspeople from Montreal
Businesspeople from Vancouver
Canadian bank presidents
Canadian Buddhists
Canadian chief executives
Canadian economists
Canadian Ministers of Foreign Affairs
Conservative Party of Canada MPs
Liberal Party of Canada MPs
Living people
Members of the 27th Canadian Ministry
Members of the 28th Canadian Ministry
Members of the House of Commons of Canada from British Columbia
Members of the Order of British Columbia
Members of the King's Privy Council for Canada
Politicians from Montreal
Politicians from Vancouver
Queen's University at Kingston alumni
University of Alberta alumni